Cattleya lobata, commonly known as the lobed sophronitis, is a species of orchid endemic to Brazil (Minas Gerais).

Images

References

External links

lobata
lobata
Endemic orchids of Brazil
Orchids of Minas Gerais